Alexander Sergeevich Davydov  (26 December 1912 – 19 February 1993) was a Soviet and Ukrainian physicist. Davydov graduated from Moscow State University in 1939. In 1963-1990 he was Director of Institute for Theoretical Physics of the Ukrainian Academy of Sciences.

His main contributions were in theory of absorption, scattering and dispersion of the light in molecular crystals. In 1948, he predicted the phenomenon that is known as Davydov splitting or factor-group splitting, "the splitting of bands in the electronic or vibrational spectra of crystals due to the presence of more than one (interacting) equivalent molecular entity in the unit cell." In the period 1958–1960 he developed the theory of collective excited states in spherical and non-spherical nuclei, known as Davydov-Filippov Model and Davydov-Chaban Model.

In 1973, Davydov applied the concept of molecular solitons in order to explain the mechanism of muscle contraction in animals. He studied theoretically the interaction of intramolecular excitations or excess electrons with autolocal breaking of the translational symmetry. These excitations are now known as Davydov solitons. In 1979, Davydov published the first textbook on quantum biology entitled "Biology and Quantum Mechanics" in Russian, which was then translated in English three years later.

Publications
 Theory of Absorption of Light by Molecular Crystals, Naukova Dumka, Kiev (1951)
 Theory of Atomic Nuclei, Nauka, Moscow (1958)
 Theory of Molecular Excitons, McGraw-Hill, New York (1962)
 Quantum Mechanics, Pergamon Press (1965)
 Theory of Molecular Excitons, Plenum Press, New York (1971)
 Theory of Solids, Nauka, Moscow (1980)
 Biology and Quantum Mechanics, Pergamon Press (1982)
 Solitons in Molecular Systems, D. Reidel (1985)
 Solitons in Bioenergetics, Naukova Dumka, Kiev (1986)
 The Theoretical Investigation of High-Temperature Superconductivity, Physics Reports, vol. 190, no. 4–5, pp. 191–306 (1990)
 High-Temperature Superconducitvity, Naukova Dumka, Kiev (1990).

See also
Metal–semiconductor junction

References

1912 births
1993 deaths
People from Yevpatoria
People from Yevpatoriysky Uyezd
20th-century Ukrainian physicists
Quantum biology
Members of the National Academy of Sciences of Ukraine
Heroes of Socialist Labour
Recipients of the Order of Lenin
Burials at Baikove Cemetery